Averrhoa is a genus of trees in the family Oxalidaceae, of the order Oxalidales, named after Averroes, a 12th-century astronomer and philosopher from Al-Andalus.

Selected species

The genus comprises about a dozen species, of which two, the carambola and the bilimbi, are cultivated for their fruits : 
Averrhoa bilimbi L. -- Bilimbi
Averrhoa carambola L. -- Starfruit or carambola
Averrhoa dolichocarpa Rugayah & Sunarti
Averrhoa leucopetala Rugayah & Sunarti
Averrhoa microphylla Tardieu
Averrhoa minima Perr.
Averrhoa sinica Hance
 List source :

References

Oxalidaceae
Oxalidales genera